Othara or Othera is an Indian village in Kerala state. It is located in Taluk Tiruvalla, in Pathanamthitta district.It Is Part Of Thiruvalla Sub-District & Thiruvalla Constituency .

This area features fertile lands; therefore agriculture is the predominant source of income for the local residents.

It is a village known for its senior citizens who come back from overseas to spend the rest of their lives. 

It is popularly known as "God's Own Country".

Geography

Othara is divided into two areas, Othara East and Othara West. It is 4 km from Kallissery on the MC road, 4 km from Nellad on the TK road, and can also can be reached from Kuttor on the Main Central Road  or Kumbanad from the State Highway 7 road.Chengannur from State Highway 10

The village is famous for its cultural heritage, which includes the Padayani festival at Puthukkulangara Devi Temple.
Pazhayakaavu Sree Krishna Swamy Temple is the only one temple in kerala where Padayani performances last for twenty-eight days in the courtyard of othera Devi temple. Its make-up materials are taken from the nature, like Spathe of Areca palm ('paala in Malayalam), Terra-cota powder, and charcoal and turmeric powder. There are different varieties of effigies to represent like Yakshi palkshi, kaalan, kuthira Maadanm marutha. Pisach, Ganapathi, Bhairavi and kaajiramaala. There are effigies with masks and crowns. Padayani is replete with human creativity and natures bounty which all leads to excellent aesthetic extravaganza.

Location
The boundaries of the village are Mangalam on the south, Thottappuzha on the north, Koipuram on the east and Kuttoor on the west. Othara is divided into Othara East and Othara West. Othara East comes under Eraviperoor Panchaythu and a part of Aranmula Assembly Constituency and Othara West comes under Kuttoor Panchayathu and a part of Thiruvalla Assembly Constituency. Both Assembly constituencies come under Pathanamthitta Loksabha constituency.

Religious places
Parithvamala Palli (Ebenezer Marthoma Church), Society Junction, Othera
Putukkulangara Devi Temple, East Othera ( Famous Padayani Temple)
Pazhaya Puthukulangara Devi Temple, West Othera
Chennamangalam Mahadevar Temple, East Othera
St. Mary's Orthodox Church
Sreekrishna Swami Temple, Pazhayakavu, East Othara
Eden Eco spirituality center Othera
IGO campus of the India Bible College & Seminary, Kumbanad, Othera
Kunnekattu Sridharma Shastha Temple, East Othera
Parithvamala Palli (Ebenezer Marthoma Church), Society Junction, Othera
Thiruvamanapuram Temple, Othera
Little Flower Malankara Catholic Church, Othara
Little Flower Knanaya Catholic Church, West Othara
St. Mary's Knanaya Church, West Othara
Mullippara Malanada Temple, West Othara
Othera Dayara, East Othara 
St. Andrew's Mar Thoma Church, West Othara
St. Paul's Marthoma Church, Althara Jn
I.P.C. Salem Church, East Othera
St. Johns C S I Church, East Othera
St. Thomas Mar Thoma Church, East Othera
St. Gregorios Knanaya Syrian Church, West Othera
I.P.C Philadelphia Church, East Othera
 Paramala Valyachan Paara (Near NSS TTI east othera)
 Mannathe Kaave (Near NSSTTI School east othera)
Church of God (full Gospel)in India, Kozhimala
Church of God (full Gospel)in India, Othera

Education

Nazareth College of Pharmacy, East Othara
A.M.M. High School, West Othara
D.V.N S S High School, Othara
N.S.S – T.T.I, Othara
Little Flower Up School, West Othara
St.Mary's UP School, Kozhimala
IGO campus of the India Bible College & Seminary, Kumbanad, Othera
E A L P School, Othara
St.Mary's  Central School, West Othara
Govt. L P School (Kodathu School), West Othera
C M S L P School, Kothaviruthy
LP school East Othera (Pazhayakaave–Puthukulangara Road)
PTPM UPS Thymaravumkara
UP School West Othera
( Thottathil School )

Health care

Govt. Primary Health Centre, East Othara
Govt. Homeo Dispensary, Nannoor

Bank
State Bank of India
Federal Bank
Muthoot Fincorp
South Indian Bank
Federal Bank
The TEC Bank
Kerala Bank
KSFE

See also

 Tiruvalla
 Kumbanad
 Chengannur

References 

Villages in Pathanamthitta district